In Greek mythology, Trochilus (Ancient Greek: Τρόχιλος Trókhilos) was a member of the Argive royal house as the son of Princess Callithyia (equated with Io "Callithyessa" in her role of the priestess of the Argive Hera).

Mythology 
Some traditions credited either him or his mother with invention of the chariot. Tertullian informs that Trochilus (if indeed it was him, and not Erichthonius, who invented the chariot) was said to have dedicated his creation to Hera. Hyginus and the scholiast on Aratus relate that the constellation Auriga was thought by some to be the stellar image of Trochilus with which he was honored for his invention.

Pausanias wrote that Trochilus was a priest of Demeter and that he had to flee Argos because of the crackdown of Agenor on him and settled in Attica, where he married a woman from Eleusis and became by her father of Triptolemus and Eubuleus.

Notes

References 

 Gaius Julius Hyginus, Astronomica from The Myths of Hyginus translated and edited by Mary Grant. University of Kansas Publications in Humanistic Studies. Online version at the Topos Text Project.
 Pausanias, Description of Greece with an English Translation by W.H.S. Jones, Litt.D., and H.A. Ormerod, M.A., in 4 Volumes. Cambridge, MA, Harvard University Press; London, William Heinemann Ltd. 1918. . Online version at the Perseus Digital Library
Pausanias, Graeciae Descriptio. 3 vols. Leipzig, Teubner. 1903.  Greek text available at the Perseus Digital Library.

Further reading 

 Pierre Grimal. A Concise Dictionary of Classical mythology. Basil Blackwell Ltd, 1990. - p. 443
 Wilhelm Heinrich Roscher (ed.): Ausführliches Lexikon der griechischen und römischen Mythologie. Band 5 (T), Leipzig 1916-1924 - s. 1214

Inachids
Argive characters in Greek mythology
Eleusinian mythology
Mythology of Argos
Demeter
Hera